The 1956 Utah Redskins football team was an American football team that represented the University of Utah as a member of the Skyline Conference during the 1956 NCAA University Division football season. In their seventh season under head coach Jack Curtice, the Redskins compiled an overall record of 5–5 with a mark of 5–1 against conference opponents, placing second in the Skyline.

Schedule

References

External links
 Official game program: Idaho at Utah – October 27, 1956

Utah
Utah Utes football seasons
Utah Redskins football